Flying Fox in a Freedom Tree is a 1989 New Zealand film directed by Martyn Sanderson.
The film is based on the 1974 short story and other work by Albert Wendt.

Synopsis
On the Samoan island of Sapepe, young Pepe is torn between tradition and modernity.

Cast

Reviews

Awards
 1989 Amiens International Film Festival (France) "Grand Prix de la Ville d'Amiens: for the film making the greatest contribution to the understanding of a culture and the identity of a people".
 1989 Tokyo International Film Festival "Best Screenplay, Nominated for Tokyo Grand Prix".

Festivals
 1990 Hawai'i
 1990 American Film Institute Film Festival 
 1991 Umea (Sweden) 
 1990 Warsaw Film Week (Poland) 
 1990 New Zealand International Film Festival

References

External links 
 

1989 films
1980s New Zealand films
1980s English-language films